Abd al-'Aziz al-'Uqaili (1919 - 1981), was an Iraqi regular military officer and Minister. He served as Minister of Defense from 21 September 1965 until 18 April 1966 under Iraqi President Abdul Salam Arif.

Biography
Al-'Uqaili was born in Mosul, a Northern city of Iraq in 1919. He graduated from Royal Military Academy in Baghdad in January 1938, and Staff Military College in 1945. Al-'Uqaili started studying law in 1946 and graduated from Law college in 1950. After the Iraqi Ba'ath Party Government overthrow by Abdul Salam Arif in November 1963, Al-'Uqaili was assigned to be Director of Iraqi ports in the Basra in the south of Iraq from 1963 until 21 September 1965. He later served as Minister of Defense from 1965 to 1966. Ba'athism caught him two months after they came to power on 17 July, 1968. The revolution court sentenced him to life imprisonment in 1970 and he died in prison on 7 May 1981.

References

1919 births
1981 deaths
Iraqi generals
Iraqi soldiers
Defence ministers of Iraq
People from Mosul
Iraqi Military Academy alumni